Cutts is a settlement in the Shetland Islands, United Kingdom. It is on the island of Trondra off the west coast of Shetland Mainland. The B9074 crosses the Trondra Bridge at the north-east of Cutts. The bridge, opened on 18 October 1971 by George Younger, has a single carriageway and connects Trondra with Shetland Mainland.

References

External links
Canmore - Trondra, The Cutts site record

Villages in Shetland